A Day at the Races is a 1937 American comedy film, and the seventh film starring the Marx Brothers (Groucho Marx, Harpo Marx and Chico Marx), with Allan Jones, Maureen O'Sullivan and Margaret Dumont. Like their previous Metro-Goldwyn-Mayer feature A Night at the Opera, this film was a major hit.

Plot
The Standish Sanitarium, owned by Judy Standish, has fallen on hard times. Banker J.D. Morgan, who owns a nearby race track, hotel and nightclub, holds the mortgage on the sanitarium and is attempting to foreclose on it in order to convert the building into a casino. Tony, Judy's faithful employee, suggests asking financial help from the wealthy patient Mrs. Emily Upjohn, who is a hypochondriac, living at the sanitarium. After being pronounced healthy by the sanitarium's doctors, Mrs. Upjohn threatens to leave for treatment by Dr. Hugo Z. Hackenbush. Tony overhears her praise of Hackenbush, who is, unknown to her, a horse doctor. When Tony lies to Mrs. Upjohn, telling her that Hackenbush has been hired to run the Sanitarium, she is elated and informs Judy she will consider helping her financially. Tony contacts Hackenbush in Florida by telegram and when the Doctor arrives he immediately insults the Sanitarium's business manager Mr. Whitmore. Whitmore, being Morgan's stooge, is suspicious of Hackenbush's medical background.

Meanwhile, Judy's beau, singer Gil Stewart, who performs at Morgan's nightclub, has just spent his life savings on a racehorse named Hi-Hat. He hopes the horse, which he purchased from Morgan, will win a race and the money will allow Judy to save the Sanitarium. Hi-Hat is so afraid of Morgan, that he rears in fright whenever he hears his voice. Gil now has no money to pay for Hi-Hat's feed, and he, Tony and Stuffy, Hi-Hat's jockey, have to resort to trickery to fend off the Sheriff who has come to collect money for the feed bill. Tony raises some money by scamming Hackenbush in the "Tutsi Fruitsy Ice Cream" scene, giving him a tip on a horse, but all in code, so he has to buy book after book to decipher it.

Whitmore attempts to contact the Florida Medical Board for information on Dr. Hackenbush. Hackenbush intercepts the call, and by impersonating the man in charge of medical records, feigning a hurricane with an electric fan, pretending 
to forget what the call was about and repeatedly calling Whitmore to the dictagraph, he enrages Whitmore until he gives up. That night, at the gala Water Carnival, Gil performs along with Vivien Fay and her ballet, and Tony and Stuffy play the piano and harp respectively. Whitmore attempts to get Hackenbush fired by having Mrs. Upjohn catch him in his suite with Flo, a blonde temptress. Stuffy overhears the plot and informs Tony, so the two attempt to thwart Hackenbush's rendezvous with the floozy by posing as house detectives and then as paperhangers. When Whitmore and Mrs. Upjohn arrive, they have hidden Flo by stuffing her under the sofa cushions.

The following day, just as Mrs. Upjohn is about to sign an agreement to help Judy, Whitmore brings in the eminent Dr. Leopold X. Steinberg from Vienna, whom he hopes will expose Hackenbush as a fraud. After Mrs. Upjohn agrees to an examination by Steinberg, Hackenbush wants to flee for fear of being exposed; Gil, Tony and Stuffy remind him that Judy still needs his help and persuade him to stay.

After making a shambles of Mrs. Upjohn's examination, Hackenbush, Tony, Stuffy and Gil hide out in Hi-Hat's stable, where Judy soon joins them. She is upset by the negative light of the situation; Gil tries to lift her spirits. Near the stable, Stuffy starts sympathizing with a community of poor black folk who believe him to be Archangel Gabriel. As the number progresses, Morgan, Whitmore and the Sheriff arrive and Hackenbush, Tony and Stuffy try to disguise themselves by painting their faces with grease in blackface. The attempt fails, everybody runs off and Whitmore finally exposes Hackenbush as a horse doctor with a letter he received from the Florida Medical Board. Hi-Hat hears Morgan's voice and bolts, easily jumping over several obstacles in the way. Judy suggests to Gil that Hi-Hat is a jumper and Gil enters him into the upcoming steeplechase race.

Morgan, who witnessed Hi-Hat's jumping prowess the night before, tries to prevent him from being entered in the race but fails. Knowing that Hi-Hat is afraid of Morgan, everyone works to make Hi-Hat aware of his presence before reaching the fence. On the last lap, Hi-Hat and Morgan's horse wipe out; when they reach the finish line, it appears that Morgan's horse has won. Stuffy realizes that the mud-covered horses were switched after the accident, and Morgan's jockey was riding Hi-Hat in the finish, thus making Hi-Hat the winner. The black folk arrive at the race and start walking with Gil, Judy, Hackenbush, Tony and Stuffy through the racetrack, all singing the final number.

Cast

Production

The film went through numerous outlines, treatments, drafts, revisions and a total of eighteen different  scripts before arriving at its final version. A major portion of the final screenplay was written by Al Boasberg who also contributed to A Night at the Opera, but due to a bitter disagreement with MGM, he chose not to be given any credit for his work. As they had with A Night at the Opera, the Brothers honed the comic material during a pre-production vaudeville tour.

Groucho's character was originally named "Quackenbush" but was changed to "Hackenbush" over threats of lawsuits by several real doctors named Quackenbush. In My Life with Groucho: A Son's Eye View, Arthur Marx relates that in his later years, Groucho increasingly referred to himself by the name Hackenbush.

During production, Irving Thalberg, who had brought the Marx Brothers to MGM in 1934, died suddenly in September, 1936 of pneumonia at the age of 37. Thalberg's death left the Marxes without a champion at MGM, and the studio never gave the same level of care and attention to the team they had received under Thalberg. As a result, the Marx Brothers' three later MGM films are generally considered to be vastly inferior to their first two.

The original release of A Day at the Races presented the water carnival sequence in light brown sepia and the ballet scene with a blue tint.

The film used Santa Anita Park as a filming location for some of the racetrack scenes.

Music
The songs in the film, by Bronislaw Kaper, Walter Jurmann, and Gus Kahn, are "On Blue Venetian Waters", "Tomorrow Is Another Day", and "All God's Chillun Got Rhythm" (featuring Ivie Anderson from Duke Ellington's orchestra). Two other songs were slated for the film, but ultimately cut . One, "Dr. Hackenbush", sung by Groucho about "what a great doctor he is" ("No matter what I treat them for they die from something else") was performed on the pre-filming tour, but was apparently never shot; Groucho later recorded the song separately. The other, "A Message From The Man In The Moon", sung by Allan Jones, was shot, but was cut at the last minute because the film was too long. The melody is heard during the opening titles, as some incidental music during the Water Carnival scene, and is "reprised" by Groucho during the final scene. The DVD release of the film includes a rediscovered audio recording for the film soundtrack of the song, performed by Allan Jones.

The film's lindy hop dance sequence is set to the tune of "All God's Chillun Got Rhythm", and featuring Whitey's Lindy Hoppers, including Willamae Ricker, Snookie Beasley, Ella Gibson, George Greenidge, Dot Miller, Johnny Innis, Norma Miller and Leon James.

"Cosi-Cosa", a song sung by Allan Jones in  A Night at the Opera, makes an instrumental cameo at the opening of the climactic racetrack scene. The tune would be heard again in the Marxes final MGM film, The Big Store (1941).

Musical numbers
 "On Blue Venetian Waters"
 "Tomorrow Is Another Day"
 "Gabriel (Who Dat Man)"
 "All God's Chillun Got Rhythm"
 "Nobody Knows the Trouble I've Seen"
 "A Message from the Man in the Moon"

Reception

Contemporary reviews from critics continued to be positive for the Marx Brothers through their seventh film. John T. McManus of The New York Times called it "comparatively bad Marx," although still deserving of "a much better than passing grade" because "any Marx brothers motion picture is an improvement upon almost any other sustained screen slapstick." Variety declared, "Surefire film fun and up to the usual parity of the madcap Marxes." Harrison's Reports wrote, "Very good! The Marx Brothers are at their best and funniest here." John Mosher of The New Yorker was also positive, writing that "Groucho, Harpo, and Chico are in full blast again," and the film "reaches a fever pitch even beyond earlier records." The Chicago Tribune called it a "ridiculous farce, plummed with unique gags, laugh provoking situations, fast action ... The finale sends audiences away grinning and happy."

Writing for Night and Day magazine of London, Graham Greene gave the film a generally good review, summarizing it as "easily the best film to be seen in London", but he criticized some elements of the film's portrayal. Greene observed that the film gave him "a nostalgia for the old cheap rickety sets" rather than the realistic sets, and although he praised Harpo's performance as "shin[ing] the brightest", he complained that the strong realism in O'Sullivan's acting set up a strong juxtaposition against the "silliness" of the Marx brothers' antics.

The film is recognized by American Film Institute in these lists:
 2000: AFI's 100 Years...100 Laughs – #59
 2005: AFI's 100 Years...100 Movie Quotes:
 Flo Marlowe: "Oh, hold me closer! Closer! Closer!"
 Dr. Hugo Z. Hackenbush: "If I hold you any closer, I'll be in back of you."

 - Nominated

According to MGM records, the film earned $1,602,000 domestically and $703,000 foreign, but because of its high cost recorded a loss of $543,000.

Awards
The dance sequence for "All God's Chillun Got Rhythm" was nominated for the short-lived Academy Award for Best Dance Direction, only given from 1935 to 1937.

In Popular culture
British rock band Queen named their 1976 studio album after the film. Their 1975 studio album was named after A Night at the Opera, the Marx Brothers' previous film. Groucho sent a handwritten note to the band, congratulating them on their excellent taste.

References

Further reading
Buxbaum, Elisabeth: Veronika, der Lenz ist da. Walter Jurmann – Ein Musiker zwischen den Welten und Zeiten. Mit einem Werkverzeichnis von Alexander Sieghardt. Edition Steinbauer, Wien 2006, 
Green, Stanley (1999) Hollywood Musicals Year by Year (2nd ed.), pub. Hal Leonard Corporation  page 70

External links

 
 
 
 
 Full description of A Day at the Races from Filmsite.org
 The Marx Brothers Council Podcast episode discussing "A Day at the Races"

1937 films
1930s sports comedy films
American black-and-white films
1930s English-language films
Films about horses
Films scored by Franz Waxman
Films directed by Sam Wood
Films produced by Irving Thalberg
American horse racing films
Marx Brothers (film series)
Metro-Goldwyn-Mayer films
American sports comedy films
1930s American films